The Jatapu River is a major tributary of the Uatumã River. Situated within the Amazon River basin, it is located in the eastern portion of state of Amazonas in north-western Brazil.

Part of the river basin is protected by the  Uatumã Biological Reserve, a strictly protected conservation unit created in 2002.

See also
List of rivers of Amazonas

References
Brazilian Ministry of Transport

Rivers of Amazonas (Brazilian state)